John Nock may refer to:

John Nock (footballer, born 1875), English footballer
John Nock (footballer, born 1909), English footballer